Marcello Pagliero (15 January 1907 – 18 October 1980) was an Italian film director, actor, and screenwriter.

Pagliero was born in London and died in Paris. He is perhaps best known for his performance in the Roberto Rossellini film Rome, Open City (1945).

He moved to France in 1947, and continued to work in film until 1960 and in French television after that.

In 1949, he was nominated with six other co-writers for an Academy Award for Best Original Screenplay for the Rossellini film Paisan.

Selected filmography

Director
 Mist on the Sea (1944)
 Desire (1946)
 A Man Walks in the City (1950)
 The Red Rose (1951)
 La Putain respectueuse (1952)
 Vestire gli ignudi (1953)
 Daughters of Destiny (1954)
 Modern Virgin (1954)
 Walk Into Paradise (1956)
 20,000 Leagues Across the Land (1961)

Screenwriter
 The Two Tigers (1941)
 Souls in Turmoil (1942)
 The Devil's Gondola (1946)
 Paisan (1946)

Actor
 Rome, Open City (1945) - Giorgio Manfredi
 Les jeux sont faits (1945) - Pierre Dumaine
 L'altra (1947) - Ing. Andrea Venturi
 Dédée d'Anvers (1948) - Francesco
 La voix du rêve (1949) - Marcel
 Tourbillon (1953) - Julio Spoletti
 Seven Thunders (1957) - Salvatore
 Le bel âge (1960) - Steph
 Les Mauvais Coups (1961) - Luigi
 Symphonie pour un massacre (1963) - Cerutti (uncredited)
 Ton ombre est la mienne (1963) - Dr. Rouvier
 Nick Carter and Red Club (1965) - Prof. Witt (uncredited)
 Les Gauloises bleues (1968) - Le marchand bohémien

External links

 Allmovie biography

1907 births
1980 deaths
Italian male film actors
Italian film directors
20th-century Italian screenwriters
Italian male screenwriters
20th-century Italian male actors
20th-century Italian male writers